Ronald Parker (23 February 1916 – 27 August 1993) was an Australian cricketer. He played in thirteen first-class matches for South Australia between 1933 and 1937.

See also
 List of South Australian representative cricketers

References

External links
 

1916 births
1993 deaths
Australian cricketers
South Australia cricketers
Cricketers from Adelaide